Cyphoma signatum, (common name: the fingerprint flamingo tongue) is a species of sea snail, a marine gastropod mollusk in the family Ovulidae, the ovulids, cowry allies or false cowries.This species was recently synonymised with Cyphoma gibbosum.

Distribution
This species is distributed in the Gulf of Mexico, the Caribbean Sea and the Lesser Antilles, along Eastern Florida and northern Haiti.

Description
The size of the shell varies between 24 mm and 45 mm.

The maximum recorded shell length is 45 mm.

Habitat 
Minimum recorded depth is 0.3 m. Maximum recorded depth is 90 m.

References

Further reading 
 Cate, C. N. 1973. A systematic revision of the recent Cypraeid family Ovulidae. Veliger 15 (supplement): 1-117.
 Rosenberg, G., F. Moretzsohn, and E. F. García. 2009. Gastropoda (Mollusca) of the Gulf of Mexico, Pp. 579–699 in Felder, D.L. and D.K. Camp (eds.), Gulf of Mexico–Origins, Waters, and Biota. Biodiversity. Texas A&M Press, College Station, Texas
 Lorenz F. & Fehse D. (2009). The Living Ovulidae - A manual of the families of Allied Cowries: Ovulidae, Pediculariidae and Eocypraeidae. Conchbooks, Hackenheim, Germany.
 Reijnen B.T. & van der Meij S.E.T. (2017). "Coat of many colours—DNA reveals polymorphism of mantle patterns and colouration in Caribbean Cyphoma Röding, 1798 (Gastropoda, Ovulidae)". PeerJ5:e3018 https://doi.org/10.7717/peerj.3018

External links

Ovulidae
Gastropods described in 1939